ESRD is a four-letter abbreviation that may refer to:

End-stage renal disease
Emergency Services Routing Digit for a wireless or mobile telephone emergency telephone number